The Essential John Farnham (also referred to as The Essential 3.0) is a compilation album by John Farnham, released as a 3-CD set on 21 August 2009, as a part of "The Essential" series. This compilation was released to promote the "John Farnham – Live by Demand" tour.

Reception

James Monger from All Music "This mammoth three-disc collection from celebrated English-born Australian pop singer John Farnham features nearly five decades of hits, from his teen pop idol days through his late-'80s/early-'90s peak and on through his charity-driven later years."

Track listing
Disc 1
"You're the Voice" (M. Ryder, C. Thompson, A. Qunta, K. Reid) – 5:02
"Chain Reaction" (D. Stewart, S. Stewart) – 3:12
"Seemed Like a Good Idea (At the Time)" (R. Wilson, J. Farnham, R. Fraser) – 4:17
"Age of Reason" (T. Hunter, J. Pigott) – 5:06
"I Remember When I Was Young" (M. Taylor) – 4:31
"One" (H. Nilsson) – 2:50
"Talk of the Town" (S. Howard) – 3:42
"Hearts on Fire" (T. Kimmel, S. Lynch) – 4:48
"Trying to Live My Life Without You" (E. Williams) – 3:26
"See the Banners Fall" (J. Farnham, D. Hirschfelder, R. Fraser) – 4:35
"Two Strong Hearts" (B. Woolley, A. Hill) – 3:31
"No Ordinary World" (L. Andersson, S. Davis) – 3:49
"Going, Going, Gone" (J. Farnham, D. Hirschfelder, R. Fraser) – 3:34
"All Kinds of People" (E. Pressley, S. Crow, K. Gilbert) – 5:16

Disc 2
"That's Freedom" (T. Kimmel, J. Chapman) – 4:18
"Pressure Down" (H. Bogdanovs) – 3:44
"When Something Is Wrong with My Baby" (J. Hayes, D. Porter) – 4:56
"Romeo's Heart" (J. Kimball, R. Vanwarmer) – 4:19
"A Touch of Paradise" (R. Wilson, G. Smith) – 4:46
"Angels" (T. Kimmel, J. Kimball) – 5:38
"In Days to Come" (J. Farnham, D. Hirschfelder, R. Fraser) – 4:05
"Everytime You Cry" (S. Peiken, G. Sutton) – 4:45
"Come Said the Boy" (E. McCusker) – 4:32
"Please Don't Ask Me" (G. Goble) – 3:19
"Beyond the Call" (D. Batteau, D. Brown, K. Dukes) – 4:41
"Comic Conversations" (J. Bromley) – 3:19
"A Simple Life" (J. Lind, R. Page) – 3:53
"Listen to the Wind" (B. Thomas, J. Stevens) – 4:24

Disc 3
"Have a Little Faith (In Us)" (R. Desalvo, A. Roman) – 5:06
"Don't You Know It's Magic" (B. Cadd) – 4:01
"Man of the Hour" (S. Hostin, D. Deviller, S. Kipner) – 4:05
"Everything's Alright" (Andrew Lloyd-Webber, Tim Rice) – 4:48
"Burn for You" (P. Buckle, J. Farnham, R. Faser) – 3:33
"Reasons" (S. See) – 4:27
"Talent for Fame" (J. Farnham, R. Fraser, R. Marx) – 4:36
"We're No Angels" (R. Wilson) – 4:50
"Love to Shine" (H. Bogdanovs, K.Dee) – 4:02
"Friday Kind of Monday" (J. Barry, E. Greenwich) – 2:44
"Raindrops Keep Fallin' on My Head" (B. Bacharach, H. David) – 2:32
"The Last Time" (Mick Jagger, K. Richards) – 3:27

Charts

Weekly charts

Year-end charts

Certifications

References

John Farnham compilation albums
2009 greatest hits albums